Red Satin also known as Satin Rouge is a 2002 Tunisian Arabic-language women oriented drama film written and directed by Raja Amari on her feature film directorial debut. The film stars Palestinian actress Hiam Abbass and Hend El Fahem in the lead roles. It reveals the story of a widow woman who radically transforms from a housewife to a seductive caberet dancer. The film had its theatrical release on 24 April 2002 and opened to mixed reviews. The film received several awards and nominations at International Film Festivals.

Cast 

 Hiam Abbass as Lilia
 Hend El Fahem as Salma
 Zinedine Soualem as Caberet Patron
 Selma Kouchy
 Faouzia Badr as Lilia's neighbour
 Nadra Lamloum as Hela
 Maher Kamoun as Chokri
 Monia Hichri as Folla

Synopsis 
After the death of her husband, the widow Lilia's (Hiam Abbass) life revolves solely around her teenage daughter Salma (Hend El Fahem). Whilst looking for Salma late one night Lilia's transformation begins when she becomes suspicious of her teenage daughter of engaging in a secret relationship with Chokri (Maher Kamoun), a darbouka drummer in Salma's dance class. To find out more, Lilia decides to follow Chokri one day. On her escapade, she follows him into his second workplace, a cabaret club. After overcoming her initial shock, Lilia becomes drawn towards the dancers and drum music. The women are very different from Lilia as they wear colourful clothing, they are showing their midriffs, and they are dancing in a sensual manner to the drumbeat. After befriending the lead dancer, Folla (Monia Hichri), Lilia is convinced to start dancing in the cabaret club. While Lilia begins dancing nightly, she simultaneously begins a romantic relationship with Chokri, who is still unaware that Lilia is Salma's mother. When Chokri ends his affair with Lilia, she is heartbroken. She later finds out it is because Salma has asked Chokri to meet her and Chokri, realizing his relationship with Salma is getting serious.

Awards and nominations

References

External links 

 
 allmmovie.com
 

2002 films
2002 drama films
Tunisian drama films
French drama films
2000s Arabic-language films
Films shot in Tunisia
2002 directorial debut films
2000s French films